The White Terror was the political repression of Taiwanese civilians under the Kuomintang (KMT)-ruled government. The period of White Terror is generally considered to have begun when martial law was declared in Taiwan on 19 May 1949, which was enabled by the 1948 Temporary Provisions against the Communist Rebellion, and ended on 21 September 1992 with the repeal of Article 100 of the Criminal Code, allowing for the prosecution of "anti-state" activities. The Temporary Provisions were repealed a year earlier on 22 April 1991 and martial law was lifted on 15 July 1987.

The period of White Terror generally does not include the 228 Incident of 1947, in which the KMT killed at least 18,000 Taiwanese civilians in response to a popular uprising, and also summarily executed many local political and intellectual elites. The two are frequently discussed in tandem as it was the catalyst that motivated the KMT to begin the White Terror. Martial law was declared and lifted twice during the 228 Incident.

Two years after the 228 Incident, the KMT retreated from mainland China to Taiwan during the closing stages of the Chinese Civil War in 1949. Wanting to consolidate its rule on its remaining territories, the KMT imposed harsh political suppression measures, which included enacting martial law, executing suspected leftists or those they suspected to be sympathetic toward the communists.  Others targeted included Taiwanese locals and indigenous peoples who participated in the 228 Incident, such as Uyongʉ Yata'uyungana, and those accused of dissidence for criticizing the government.

The KMT carried out persecutions against those who criticized or opposed the government, accusing them of attempting to subvert the regime, while excessively expanding the scope of punishment throughout this period. It made use of the Taiwan Garrison Command (TGC), a secret police, as well as other intelligence units by enacting special criminal laws as tools for the government to purge dissidents. Basic human rights and the right to privacy were disregarded, with mass pervasive monitoring of the people, filings of sham criminal cases against anyone who were suspected as being a dissident, as well as labelling any individuals who were not conforming a pro-regime stance as being communist spies, often without merit.  It is estimated that about 3,000 to 4,000 civilians were executed by the government during the White Terror. The government was also suspected of carrying out extrajudicial killings against exiles in other countries.

Pro-democracy demonstrations attempted during this period, such as the Kaohsiung Incident, were harshly suppressed. The KMT ruled as a one-party state, with the existence of any other political parties strictly outlawed, resulting in non-existent competitive elections; unapproved tangwai candidates that won elections such as Hsu Hsin-liang would be spuriously impeached and often forced into exile. Even so, such restricted elections were marred by overt voter fraud, most notably during the Zhongli incident.

The ideology, theory and repression ruling pattern of Chiang Kai-shek's KMT's regime in mainland China and subsequently in Taiwan has been compared by some academics and scholars to fascist regimes elsewhere, such as Nazi Germany, with the National Revolutionary Army heavily dependent and inspired by the German military mission during the Sino-German cooperation (1926–1941) until Adolf Hitler decided to withdraw in 1938 to align with Imperial Japan. When Chiang retreated to Taiwan in 1949, his regime refused to establish a parliamentary democracy, but continued a variation of the fascist state in Taiwan. The legacy of authoritarianism and fascism during the White Terror in Taiwan has persisted until today, and political discussions about this topic continues to be highly controversial on the island.

Time period

The White Terror is generally considered to have begun with the declaration of martial law on 19 May 1949. For its ending date, some sources cite the lifting of martial law on 15 July 1987, while others cite the repeal of Article 100 of the Criminal Code on 21 September 1992, which allowed for the persecution of people for "anti-state" activities. Martial law officially lasted for almost four decades, which had been the longest period of martial law in the world at the time it was lifted. It is now the second longest, after Syria's 48-year period of martial law which lasted from 1963 to 2011.

Most prosecutions took place between the first two decades as the KMT wanted to consolidate its rule on the island. Most of those prosecuted were labeled by the Kuomintang (KMT) as "bandit spies", meaning communist spies, and punished as such, often with execution. Chiang Kai-shek, once famously said that he would rather "mistakenly kill 1,000 innocent people than allow one communist to escape".

The KMT mostly imprisoned Taiwan's intellectual and social elite out of fear that they might resist KMT rule or sympathize with communism. For example, the Formosan League for Reemancipation was a Taiwanese independence group established in 1947, which the KMT believed to be under communist control, leading to its members being arrested in 1950. The World United Formosans for Independence was persecuted for similar reasons. However, other prosecutions did not have such clear reasoning, such as in 1968, when Bo Yang was imprisoned for his choice of words in translating a Popeye comic strip. A large number of the White Terror's other victims were mainland Chinese, many of whom owed their evacuation to Taiwan to the KMT.

Many mainlander victims of White Terror, such as Bo Yang and Li Ao, moved on to promote Taiwan's democratization and the reform of the Kuomintang. In 1969, future president Lee Teng-hui was detained and interrogated for more than a week by the Taiwan Garrison Command, which demanded to know about his "communist activities" and told him "killing you at this moment is as easy as crushing an ant to death." Three years later he was invited to join the cabinet of Chiang Ching-kuo.

Fear of discussing the White Terror and the February 28 Incident gradually decreased with the lifting of martial law after the 1987 Lieyu massacre, culminating in the establishment of an official public memorial and an apology by President Lee Teng-hui in 1995. In 2008, President Ma Ying-jeou addressed a memorial service for the White Terror in Taipei. Ma apologized to the victims and their family members on behalf of the government and expressed the hope that Taiwan would never again experience a similar tragedy.

Victims

Around 140,000 Taiwanese were imprisoned under harsh treatment during this period, with many either indirectly dying or suffering various health problems in the process. About 3,000 to 4,000 were directly executed for their real or perceived opposition to the KMT's Chiang Kai-shek government. Most of the victims of the White Terror were men, however, a number of women were tortured and/or executed.

Examples
 1949: The July 13 Penghu incident, where secondary school students, mostly refugees from Shandong province, were conscripted by force as soldiers on July 13. Two principals and five students were executed for attempting to report the incident.
 1949 – 1955: 1196 ROC Navy crews were imprisoned with uncountable members being executed.
 1952: , where many teachers were arrested and executed.
 1952: Luku incident (鹿窟事件), during which 35 people were executed and 98 imprisoned.
 1953: Aborigine leaders, including Major  and musician Uyongʉ Yata'uyungana, were cheated to be arrested, then executed in 1954.
 1953 – 1954: Polish civilian tanker Praca and general cargo ship Prezydent Gottwald were assaulted on the Pacific Ocean with 1 death in custody; 29 Chinese sailors were imprisoned up to 35 years with 3 executed and 6 death.
 1954: Soviet civilian tanker Tuapse was privateered in high sea with 49 crew being mistreated and detained up to 34 years and 3 death.
 1955: Over 300 subordinate officers of pro-British/American general Sun Li-jen were arrested, tortured and imprisoned for high treason as communist spies. Sun was under house arrest for 33 years until 1988.
 1957: May 24 incident, Chiang Ching-kuo's China Youth Corps along with military and police officers instigated anti-American riots after a shooting incident; Embassy of the United States was also sieged.
 1960: Lei Chen, publisher of the Free China Journal and scholars organizing a democratic party were arrested, and imprisoned up to 10 years, where his memoir in jail time was incinerated.
 1961:  case: The TGC arrested over 300 Taiwanese independence supporters in secret trials, but was reported by AFP and reduced to 49.
 1979: Eight pro-democracy activists are arrested following a protest on December 10, later known as the Kaohsiung Incident.
 1980: The mother and twin daughters of democracy activist Lin Yi-hsiung (arrested following the Kaohsiung incident) are stabbed to death on February 28.
 1981: Carnegie Mellon statistics professor Chen Wen-chen is found dead on July 3 after a long interrogation session with government officials during a visit to Taiwan
 1984: Journalist Henry Liu is assassinated at his home in Daly City, California for writings disparaging President of the Republic of China, Chiang Ching-kuo. The assassination is thought to have been orchestrated by Pai Wan-hsiang.
 1987: 1987 Lieyu massacre: 19 landed refugees were killed by the military and evidence was destroyed.  The ROC government denied that the incident occurred after it was reported by journalists and during questioning by the parliament.

Legacy

Since the lifting of martial law in 1987, the government has set up the 228 Incident Memorial Foundation, a civilian reparations fund supported by public donations for the victims and their families. However, there was never a proper truth and reconciliation commission. Many descendants of victims remain unaware that their family members were victims, while many of the families of victims, especially from Mainland China, did not know the details of their relatives' mistreatment during the riot.

Film
 The 1958 film E.A. — Extraordinary Accident by Viktor Ivchenko in 1958 tells the first year story of the Tanker Tuapse crew with the leading distribution of 47.5 million USSR viewers in 1959.
 Hou Hsiao-hsien's A City of Sadness, the first movie dealing with the February 28 incident, won the Golden Lion at the 1989 Venice Film Festival.
 The 1989 dark humor Banana Paradise is the second film of the Taiwan Modern Trilogy by Wang Toon, who applied a real cross-strait case reported in 1988 to develop the script with the preposterous irony of a Chinese Mainlander refugee couple's struggle living with fake identifications since the Chinese Civil War throughout the White Terror era till the reunion of divided families in 1988.
 The 1991 teen-crime drama A Brighter Summer Day by Edward Yang adopts a real street murder case in Taipei in 1961, where a group of high school students' lives were twisted by the gestapo-style Taiwan Garrison Command agents and the mafia activities in the military dependents' village. The film won the Best Film Award in the 36th Asia-Pacific Film Festival, Gold Train Award (Best Film) in the Faro Island Film Festival, Special Jury Prize in the Tokyo International Film Festival, Best Director Awards in the 13th Festival des 3 Continents and in the 5th Singapore International Film Festival.
 The 1995 romance Good Men, Good Women by Hou Hsiao-hsien based on the biography book named after the Japanese song <幌馬車の唄> in real life of Chiang Bi-Yu as a political prisoner (Daughtor of Chiang Wei-shui, starring Annie Yi in 3 interlude roles) to research the complexity of Taiwanese history and national identity.
 The 1995 blue drama Heartbreak Island, a winner of NETPAC Award in the 1996 International Film Festival Rotterdam describes the mind struggle flashbacks of a student activist being finally released after 10 years in prison for participating the 1979 Kaohsiung Incident, but only finding that her old comrades have changed to give up ideals and keep chilly distance.
The 1995 film Super Citizen Ko by Wan Jen surrounding a political prisoner during martial law who looks for the grave of a friend who was executed.
 The 2000 criminal mystery Forgotten or Forgiven by Zhong-zheng Wang and Wei-jian Hong, portraits a grim police detective growing up from the harsh environment of a  White Terror victim family follows a lead to discover the true identity of the low-profiled target, his partner's father, as actually a secret agency deserter with the repentance through life against the Agency who involved in his case, then solved the conundrum in 2 generations after the final showdown of the deserter confronting his old commander.
 The 2009 biography Prince of Tears by Yonfan, nominated for the Golden Lion at the 66th Venice International Film Festival and selected as the Hong Kong entry for the 82nd Academy Awards for Best Foreign Language Film, is a real-life story of Taiwanese actress Chiao Chiao (aka. Lisa Chiao), whose father was falsely accused and executed during the White Terror in 1950s. Then, her mother was also arrested, and she and her sister became homeless as their house was confiscated.
 The 2009 political thriller Formosa Betrayed by Adam Kane portraits an FBI investigator tracing multi-murder cases to find the truth, inspired by the real cases including the assassination of journalist Henry Liu in California in 1984, the unsolved death of Chen Wen-chen of Carnegie Mellon University in 1981, and the serial murders of Lin Yi-hsiung family in 1980.
 The 2019 horror film Detention, an adaptation of the eponymous video game based on true events, specifically the 1947 Keelung Senior High School Incident where dozens of students, teachers and journalists were either executed or imprisoned for political reasons during the White Terror.
 The 2019 VR film Bodyless by Prof. Hsin-Chien Huang of NTNU, Special Mention of 2019 Kaohsiung Film Festival, and Honorary Mention in the Computer Animation category of Prix Ars Electronica 2020, describes how the soul of a dead political prisoner left his jailed body in the suppressed environment of ROC military ruling with martial law, then finally freely found his way home.

Literature
 Vern Sneider's novel A Pail of Oysters in 1953 was based on the officer's personal field survey revealing people's life in Taiwanese society under suppression in 1950s, was banned by Chinese Nationalists' authorities until being reissued in 2016 – 35 years after his death.
 Tehpen Tasi's autobiography Elegy of Sweet Potatoes in 1994, based on his testimony with the other political prisoners together for 13 months in 1954–1955.
 Julie Wu's The Third Son in 2013 describes the event and its aftermath from the viewpoint of a Taiwanese boy.
 Jennifer J. Chow's The 228 Legacy in 2013 focuses on how there was such an impact that it permeated throughout multiple generations within the same family.
 Shawna Yang Ryan's Green Island in 2016 tells the story of the incident as it affects three generations of a Taiwanese family.
 Ken Liu's The Paper Menagerie & Other Short Stories in 2016 includes a short story titled The Literomancer which references the 228 incident from the perspective of a young American girl who had recently moved to Taiwan, and asks both her father, who works on an American military base, and a neighbor, and old man named Mr. Kan about the incident. It develops on these two different perspectives throughout the story, becoming progressively darker.
 Principle Jian Tian-lu's Hushen, a 2019 literature award winner expresses the humanity concern in contrast with the brutality on the first scene of 1987 Lieyu massacre.

Games
 In 2014, Sharp Point Press and Future-Digi publicized the Rainy Port Keelung with 3 light novels telling a love story in the background of Keelung Massacre during the Feb. 28 incident.
 In 2017, Taiwanese game developer Red Candle Games launched Detention, a survival horror video game created and developed for Steam. It is a 2D atmospheric horror side-scroller set in 1960s Taiwan under martial law following the 228 incident. The critically acclaimed game also incorporates religious elements based on Taiwanese culture and mythology. Rely On Horror gave the game a 9 out of 10, saying that "every facet of Detention moves in one harmonious lockstep towards an unavoidable tragedy, drowning out the world around you."
 In 2017, Erotes Studio produced Blue Blood Lagoon with the story of high-school students running for life to escape from the bloodshed of military conscription arrest, prosecution and execution during the July 13 Penghu incident.
 In 2019, Team Padendon publicized a ghost RPG PAGUI based on a true family story of the Kaohsiung Massacre victims in Feb. 28 Incident: An orphan raised by a temple uncovered his identity and looked for his dispersed family for over 60 years with no result until he died; an old lady in her 90s heard the news arrives but only find her son in the coffin.
 In 2020, MatchB Studio produced an adventure puzzle Halflight with two brothers playing near a base witnessed an execution site upon the Feb. 28 incident, and one fell missing in chaos, followed by the family being persecuted apart, so the little boy went back trying to find the younger brother, but only stepped into the worse ending in 50 years.

Memorials
 228 Peace Memorial Park
 Green Island Human Rights Culture Park
 Jing-Mei White Terror Memorial Park
 Tianma Tea House

See also

 Anti-communism
 Anti-communist mass killings
 Fascism in Asia
 History of Taiwan
 History of the Kuomintang
 History of the Republic of China
 Kaohsiung Incident
 Neo-fascism
 Political status of Taiwan
 Politics of the Republic of China
 Period of mobilization for the suppression of Communist rebellion
 Shanghai massacre
 Wild Lily student movement
 Transitional Justice Commission
 Campaign to Suppress Counterrevolutionaries

Notes and references

Notes

Citations

Works cited

English language

Chinese language (Traditional)

External links

Remembering Taiwan's White Terror – The Diplomat

 
White Terror
Political repression in Taiwan
Human rights abuses in Taiwan
Political history of Taiwan
Taiwan under Republic of China rule
Political and cultural purges
Politicides
Fascism in Taiwan
Anti-communist terrorism
20th century in Taiwan
1949 establishments in Taiwan
1949 in Taiwan
1950s in Taiwan
1960s in Taiwan
1970s in Taiwan
1980s in Taiwan
1980s disestablishments in Taiwan